Kajal Shrestha is a Nepali right and batswoman and a wicketkeeper for the Nepal women's national cricket team.

Kajal was in the playing 11 of the Nepal women first twenty 20 International debut match against China women's national cricket team. She also represented Nepal in the 2019 ICC Women's Qualifier Asia in Bangkok, Thailand. It was a tournament which is an Asia region qualifier for the 2019 ICC Women's World Twenty20 Qualifier as well as the 2020 Women's Cricket World Cup Qualifier tournaments, with the top team progressing to both of them.

In October 2021, she was named in Nepal's side for the 2021 ICC Women's T20 World Cup Asia Qualifier tournament in the United Arab Emirates.

References

External links 
 Kajal Shrestha at Cricinfo

1999 births
Living people
Nepal women Twenty20 International cricketers
South Asian Games bronze medalists for Nepal
South Asian Games medalists in cricket
Cricketers at the 2014 Asian Games
Nepalese women cricketers
Asian Games competitors for Nepal